Edward Francis Whately Eliot (15 April 1864 – 29 June 1943) was an Anglican Archdeacon in the Mediterranean.

Eliot was educated at Haileybury and Trinity College, Cambridge; and ordained in 1886. After curacies in Tufnell Park and Bournemouth he held incumbencies in Southampton, Eastbourne and Haywards Heath. He was Chaplain of St Michael, Beaulieu-sur-Mer from 1921 to 1934. After that he was Canon of Gibraltar and Archdeacon in Italy and the French Riviera until his death.

References

Archdeacons in the Diocese in Europe

1864 births
Alumni of Trinity College, Cambridge
1943 deaths
People educated at Haileybury and Imperial Service College
Archdeacons in the Diocese in Europe